Chionodes aprilella is a moth of the family Gelechiidae. It is found in Russia (southern Ural, Altai Mountains, southern Buryatia, Transbaikal).

References

Moths described in 1995
Chionodes
Moths of Asia